The 2005–06 Marquette Golden Eagles men's basketball team represented Marquette University in the 2005–06 season. Their head coach was Tom Crean. They received an at-large bid to the 2006 NCAA Division I men's basketball tournament, where they lost in the first round to Alabama. This was the first year in which Marquette played in the Big East Conference, having previously played in Conference USA.

Schedule

|-
!colspan=9 style=| Non-conference regular season

|-
!colspan=9 style=|Big East regular season

|-
!colspan=9 style=| Big East tournament

|-
!colspan=9 style=| NCAA tournament

References 

Marquette Golden Eagles men's basketball seasons
Marquette
Marquette Golden Eagles
Marquette
Marquette